George Street is the main street of Dunedin, the second largest city in the South Island of New Zealand. It runs for two and a half kilometres north-northeast from The Octagon in the city centre to the foot of Pine Hill. It is straight and undulates gently as it skirts the edge of the hills to its northwest. South of The Octagon, Princes Street  continues the line of George Street south-southwest for two kilometres.

History

Early history
In the early years of Dunedin's settlement, much of the city's growth was on two areas of reasonably flat land close to the harbour, separated by the large Bell Hill and an area of low swampy land. The northern of these two flat areas surrounded the floodplain of the Water of Leith, a small river that runs through Dunedin. As the city grew the swamp was drained to become the new city's centre, and the hill was lowered by excavation to allow access between the two areas of settlement. A street grid was set up with the main road split in two by the city centre (now The Octagon) - Princes Street to the south and George Street to the north. Both these names, along with many of the city's other street names, reflect those in Edinburgh, Scotland.

In the settlement's early days, Bell Hill proved a major obstacle to travel south of the city centre, and major excavation work was carried out to provide access to the south. Once the cut was completed, Princes Street quickly became the city's central business district, especially the area between the original docks (now the Exchange area) and around the cutting. Increased development to the north of the Octagon saw a slow but inexorable drift of the city's business heart to George Street, a trend possibly accelerated by the growth of the city's tertiary education sector, especially the University of Otago. Much of the city's economic and retail heart now lies between the University and the Octagon in the first few blocks of George Street and in the streets which cross it (notably Hanover Street and St. Andrew Street), and the two roads which run parallel to either side of George Street (Filleul Street to the west, and Great King Street to the east).

Pedestrianisation

In late September 2021, the Dunedin City Council voted by a margin of nine to five to establish a one-way traffic zone in George Street between Frederick Street and Moray Place in order to increase space for pedestrians and cyclists. While councillors Carmen Houlahan and Lee Vandervis, local businesses and the Automobile Association Otago criticised the proposal on the grounds that it would lead to increased traffic congestion, this was supported by the Otago University Students' Association, CCS Disability Action Otago, and Generation Zero. In response to Mayor Aaron Hawkins' support for the traffic zone, Dunedin retailer Brent Weatherall barred Hawkins from his George St premises.

By early October 2022, paving was under way in the Farmers block of George Street. The Council also began planting nine tree species including field maple, Japanese elm, sourgum, tōtara, kōwhai, maidenhair, tulip tree, European beech, and mountain beech trees. In addition, quotes by Merekihereke Hape and Hone Tuwhare were inscribed into concrete pavers on the  corner of George and St Andrew streets. According to the Otago Daily Times, the George Street redevelopment including replacing pipes is estimated to cost about NZ$40 million and conclude in 2024.

By 11 November, the Farmers block of the development was completed with a small ceremony held celebrate the milestone. Former critic Weatherall, who had been elected last month as a Dunedin City councillor, praised the redevelopment as a "vast improvement on what was there before" but questioned the 10km speed limit. The Council also announced that redevelopment would begin in the Knox block of George Street between Frederick and Albany Streets, with completion due in January 2023. In response to a planned review of the George Street redevelopment by newly-elected Mayor Jules Radich, Disabled Persons Assembly coordinator Chris Ford urged the Council not to go ahead with a review, stating that redevelopment changes made it easier for wheelchair users to cross the street.

In early December 2022, Radich proposed a review at the next Council meeting to maintain two-way traffic along George Street. On 10 February, DCC staff warned that redesigning George Street to incorporate "two-way design" could delay further construction by four to eight months, potentially costing $1 million.

Historic buildings

Until the early years of the 20th century, George Street stopped at the banks of the Leith at its northern end. A bridge, built in 1903, was one of few in the city to survive disastrous floods in March 1929. This bridge, simply known as George Street Bridge, is registered as a Category II historic structure by Heritage New Zealand.

Numerous other buildings on George Street also have Historic Places Trust protection, notably Knox Church (Category I), Other buildings with Category I or II protection include commercial buildings at 207, 310, 398, and 412a George Street; a hotel at 619 George Street; and residential properties at 504 (now used commercially), 521, 603 607, 613 657 1008, and 1014 George Street, as well as semi-detached houses at 637 and 641 George Street and a terraced block, 1046–1056 George Street. The former Bank of New Zealand building (now a real estate agent's premises), adjoining George Street close to Knox Church on the corner of London and Pitt Street, is also a Category II building.

Modern George Street

George Street is an interesting mix of different types of property. The southern kilometre is taken up by Dunedin's CBD, with the city's civic centre and library occupying much of the first block (the majority of blocks are 200 metres long). In early 2018, Barnes Dance crossings were introduced at either end of this block, at George Street's intersections with The Octagon and Moray Place.

Beyond this is a major shopping precinct, including Dunedin's largest shopping mall, the Meridian Mall. As the street approaches the northern end of its shopping area, many of the shops have a Southeast Asian flavour, in part due to the large proportion of Malaysian and Chinese students at the University of Otago, some 500 metres to the east.

At the northern end of the main shopping area the skyline is dominated by the spire of Knox Church, designed by R. A. Lawson. Beyond this is a mix of older residential houses and hotels. Many of Dunedin's more attractive inner city properties are at the north end of the street, quite a number of which have been divided up as student flats.

Close to the street's northern end is the entrance to Woodhaugh Gardens, a major park, which lies to the west of George Street along the south-western bank of the Leith. Shortly after crossing the Leith, George Street ends, after passing under the Pine Hill Extension (part of State Highway 1). Beyond this bridge the street becomes Bank Street, a suburban arterial road, turning to the east before reaching a major junction at The Gardens.

See also
George Street, Edinburgh
Elizabeth Dreaver

References

External links
World War I-era photograph of George Street, looking north from the Octagon. The modern view at the top of this Wikipedia article is from only one block further up the street.

Streets in Dunedin
Shopping districts and streets in New Zealand
Central Dunedin